Herman I may refer to:

 Herman I (Archbishop of Cologne) (died in 924)
 Herman I, Duke of Swabia (died in 949)
 Herman I, Count Palatine of Lotharingia (died in 996)
 Herman I, Margrave of Meissen (died in 1038)
 Herman I, Margrave of Baden (c. 1040 – 1074)
 Herman I, Count of Winzenburg (c. 1083 – 1137 or 1138)
 Herman I, Lord of Lippe (ruled 1158–1167)
 Hermann I, Landgrave of Thuringia (died in 1217)
 Herman I, Count of Henneberg (1224–1290)
 Hermann I, Count of Celje (1433-1485)